Gokulnagar railway station is a small railway station in Patna district, Bihar. Its code is XGN. It serves Patna city. The station consists of 1 platform.

References

External links 

 Official website of the Patna district

Railway stations in Patna district
Danapur railway division